Alexandr Bolsacov (born 19 November 1994) is a Moldovan footballer who plays for Moldovan National Division club FC Dinamo-Auto Tiraspol as a defender.

References 

Living people
Moldovan footballers
1994 births
People from Tiraspol
Association football defenders
FC Sheriff Tiraspol players